Maggie Han (born 1959) is an American retired actress. Her career began with modeling jobs in the United States and France and progressed to acting in film and television productions. She is best known for playing Yoshiko Kawashima in The Last Emperor and Cheryl the lawyer in the NBC sitcom Seinfeld.

Biography
Maggie Han was born in Providence, Rhode Island. Her parents were retired music professors who immigrated to the United States from South Korea. She grew up enthralled by feminist literature and stated that she developed an "aversion to the idea of marriage and a family." At the age of 16, Han enrolled at Harvard University and majored in American history. Upon the suggestion of a stranger, she contacted a local modeling agency and began working part time. After receiving an increasing number of job offers, Han decided to model full time in Paris.

She modeled for six years in Paris and later New York and has described one of her more memorable experiences as being a photo-shoot in a war-torn area of Lebanon. In 1983, Han returned to Harvard to continue working on her degree. While there, she became an award-winning reporter for the Harvard Crimson newspaper. During this time she got a deal to do part-time modeling for the pantyhose company L'eggs and appeared in several commercials for them. In 1985, Han received an offer to audition for the miniseries Space. To make her acting debut in that series, she again dropped out of Harvard but stated that returning for a second time was a possibility. Afterward, she moved to Los Angeles to pursue further acting roles, including Sandy in several episodes of LA Law and Eastern Jewel in The Last Emperor, her film debut.

Filmography

References

External links

1959 births
Living people
Female models from Rhode Island
American actresses of Korean descent
American people of South Korean descent
20th-century American actresses
Actresses from Rhode Island
Actors from Providence, Rhode Island
Harvard University alumni
21st-century American women